American Family Association v. City and County of San Francisco is a case in which the American Family Association (AFA) challenged the City and County of San Francisco's actions opposing an AFA sponsored advertisement campaign as a violation of the First Amendment to the United States Constitution.

In 1998, a full-page advertisement regarding homosexuality and Christianity was placed in the San Francisco Chronicle as part of the nationwide "Truth in Love" campaign by several Christian right organizations. The advertisement stated, "God abhors any form of sexual sin," including homosexuality, and further stated that many people have walked out of homosexuality into sexual celibacy and marriage through the help of Jesus Christ. The advertisement was labeled by the  City and County of San Francisco as "hateful rhetoric," which incites hate crimes. San Francisco officials discouraged local TV and radio stations from running Truth in Love advertisements.

In October 1999, the AFA filed the suit against the City and County of San Francisco with support from Family Research Council and Virginia based Kerusso Ministries. The suit claims the City and County of San Francisco violated the First Amendment's Establishment Clause by expressing hostility towards a religion and violated the First Amendment's Free Speech and Free Exercise clauses by the City's attempt to prevent "Truth in Love" advertisements.

In June 2000, Oakland District court ruled the Defendant's actions did not violate the First Amendment and stated the City and County of San Francisco was only doing its duty to address public safety by encouraging local media not to run the advertisements. The AFA appealed the decision and the United States District Court for the Northern District of California affirmed the District court ruling.

The majority opinion was written by Michael Daly Hawkins and the dissenting/concurring opinion was written by John T. Noonan, Jr.

Background 

On October 19, 1998, the San Francisco Board of Supervisors, led by Leslie Katz, wrote a letter to the AFA in response to an ad placed in the newspaper. The letter stated:

During the same time, the City and County of San Francisco passed two resolutions. The first resolution was summarized by Judge Hawkins as:

The second resolution was summarized by Judge Hawkins as:

See also
 Ex-gay
 Christianity and homosexuality
 SLAPP lawsuit

Footnotes

References 
AMERICAN FAMILY ASSOCIATION, INC.; DONALD WILDMON; KERUSSO MINISTRIES; FAMILY RESEARCH COUNCIL V. CITY AND COUNTY OF SAN FRANCISCO; LESLIE KATZ, in her capacity as a member of the San Francisco Board of Supervisors. United States Court of Appeals for the Ninth Circuit. Retrieved on 2007-06-24. (alternative link)
Center for Law and Policy, Active Cases. American Family Association. Retrieved on 2006-07-01. (archived link)
Religious groups can't sue city for condemning anti-gay ads. Associated Press (published on Freedom Forum). 2002-01-17 Retrieved on 2007-06-01. (archived link)
"Judge: San Francisco Had Duty To Call Christians Ads Hate Speech". Catholic World News (2000-06-29). Retrieved on 2007-11-05.

Discrimination in California
Ex-gay movement
Legal history of San Francisco
Establishment Clause case law
United States free exercise of religion case law
United States Free Speech Clause case law
LGBT and Protestantism
American Family Association
United States LGBT rights case law
2002 in United States case law
2002 in LGBT history
2002 in religion
2002 in San Francisco